Arkadi Ivanovich Alov (4 December 1914 – 24 May 1982) was a Soviet football player, coach, and referee.

External links
 

1914 births
1982 deaths
Soviet footballers
Soviet football managers
Soviet football referees
People from Yaroslavl Governorate
Association football midfielders
FC Dynamo Saint Petersburg players
FC Zenit Saint Petersburg players
Soviet Top League players
FC Zenit Saint Petersburg managers
FC Dynamo Saint Petersburg managers
FC Neftchi Farg'ona managers
FC Kosmos-Kirovets Saint Petersburg managers